Jorge Joaquín Pucheta (born 9 June 1992) is an Argentine professional footballer who plays as a goalkeeper for Cumbayá FC.

Club career
Pucheta, having joined their youth in 2002 from CSyD Sampdoria, began his senior career with Lanús, becoming a first-team member from the 2010–11 season - though wouldn't feature competitively for the Primera División team. Pucheta signed for Tristán Suárez in 2013, prior to securing a contract with Los Andes a year later. After no appearances for either of the Primera B Metropolitana outfits, Pucheta moved across to Torneo Federal A - the other third tier - to join Alvarado in 2015. He made his senior debut on 22 March against Independiente, which was the first of nineteen total appearances. Estudiantes signed Pucheta in 2016.

On 8 July 2018, having featured seventy-one times across three campaigns for Estudiantes, Pucheta joined fellow Primera B Metropolitana side All Boys. He participated in his opening matches for them in August against San Miguel, Fénix and Sacachispas. His first year there ended with promotion to Primera B Nacional. He subsequently appeared twenty times in the curtailed 2019–20 season, before featuring four times in the early stages of 2020. On 25 December 2020, Pucheta was announced as a new signing for 2021 by Ecuadorian Serie A side Macará. In February 2022, he signed fellow league club Cumbayá FC.

International career
Pucheta was selected by José Luis Brown for the 2009 FIFA U-17 World Cup in Nigeria, though didn't play as they reached the round of sixteen; they were eliminated by Colombia.

Personal life
Pucheta's sister, Ailen, is also a footballer; she played for Lanús' women's team.

Career statistics
.

References

External links

1992 births
Living people
People from Villa Ángela
Argentine footballers
Argentine expatriate footballers
Association football goalkeepers
Sportspeople from Chaco Province
Torneo Federal A players
Primera B Metropolitana players
Primera Nacional players
Club Atlético Lanús footballers
CSyD Tristán Suárez footballers
Club Atlético Los Andes footballers
Club Atlético Alvarado players
Estudiantes de Buenos Aires footballers
All Boys footballers
C.S.D. Macará footballers
Expatriate footballers in Ecuador
Argentine expatriate sportspeople in Ecuador